The bibliography of John Keats is a list of his poetry.

Works

 
 A Draught of Sunshine
 Addressed to Haydon (1816) text
 Addressed to the Same (1816) text
 After dark vapours have oppressed our plains (1817)
 As from the darkening gloom a silver dove (1814)
 Asleep! O sleep a little while, white pearl! text
 A Song About Myself text
 Bards of Passion and of Mirth text
 Before he went to live with owls and bats (1817?)
 Bright star, would I were steadfast as thou art (1819) 
 Calidore: A Fragment (1816)
 The Cap and Bells; or, the Jealousies, a Faery Tale (Unfinished, 1819)
 The Day Is Gone, And All Its Sweets Are Gone
 Dedication. To Leigh Hunt, Esq.
 A Dream, After Reading Dante's Episode Of Paolo And Francesca text
 A Draught of Sunshine
 Endymion: A Poetic Romance (1817)
 Epistle to John Hamilton Reynolds
 Epistle to My Brother George
 First Love
 The Eve of Saint Mark (Unfinished, 1819)
 The Eve of St. Agnes (1819) text
 The Fall of Hyperion: A Dream (Unfinished, 1819)
 Fancy (poem)
 Fill for me a brimming bowl (1814) text
 Fragment of an Ode to Maia
 Give me women, wine, and snuff (1815 or 1816)
 God of the golden bow (1816 or 1817)
 The Gothic looks solemn (1817)
 Had I a man's fair form, then might my sighs (1815 or 1816)
 Hadst thou liv'd in days of old (1816)
 Happy is England! I could be content (1816)
 Hither, hither, love (1817 or 1818)
 How many bards gild the lapses of time (1816)
 The Human Seasons
 Hymn To Apollo
 Hyperion (Unfinished, 1818)
 I am as brisk (1816)
 I had a dove
 I stood tip-toe upon a little hill (1816)
 If By Dull Rhymes Our English Must Be Chain'd (also known as "On the Sonnet")
 Imitation of Spenser (1814) text
 In Drear-Nighted December
 Isabella or The Pot of Basil (1818) text
 Keen, fitful gusts are whisp'ring here and there (1816)
 La Belle Dame sans Merci (1819, revised 1820) text
 Lamia (1819)
 Lines Written on 29 May, the Anniversary of Charles's Restoration, on Hearing the Bells Ringing (1814 or 1815)
 Lines on Seeing a Lock of Milton's Hair (1818)
 Lines on The Mermaid Tavern
 Meg Merrilies
 Modern Love (Keats)
 O Blush Not So!
 O come, dearest Emma! the rose is full blown (1815)
 O grant that like to Peter I (1817?)
 O Solitude! if I must with thee dwell (1815 or 1816)
 O Thou Whose Face
 Ode (Keats)
 Ode on a Grecian Urn (1819) text
 Ode on Indolence (1819)
 Ode on Melancholy (1819) text
 Ode to a Nightingale (1819) text
 Ode to Apollo (1815)
 Ode to Fanny
 Ode to May (1818)
 Ode to Psyche (1819)
 Oh Chatterton! how very sad thy fate (1815)
 Oh! how I love, on a fair summer's eve (1816)
 Old Meg (1818)
 On a Dream
 On a Leander Which Miss Reynolds, My Kind Friend, Gave Me (1817)
 On Death text
 On Fame, 1 & 2 text
 On First Looking into Chapman's Homer (1816) text
 On Leaving Some Friends at an Early Hour (1816)

 On Peace (1814) text
 On Receiving a Curious Shell, and a Copy of Verses, from the Same Ladies (1815)
 On Receiving a Laurel Crown from Leigh Hunt (1816 or 1817)
 On Seeing the Elgin Marbles (1817)
 On Sitting Down to Read King Lear Once Again (1818)
 On the Grasshopper and Cricket (1816)
 On the Sea (1817) text
 On The Story of Rimini (1817)
 On Visiting the Tomb of Burns (1818)
 The Poet (a fragment)
 A Prophecy - To George Keats in America
 Read Me a Lesson, Muse (1818)
 Robin Hood. To A Friend
 Sharing Eve's Apple
 Sleep and Poetry (1816)
 A Song of Opposites
 Specimen of an Induction to a Poem (1816)
 Staffa (1795)
 Stay, ruby breasted warbler, stay (1814)
 Stanzas (1818)
 Think not of it, sweet one, so (1817)
 This Living Hand
 This pleasant tale is like a little copse (1817)
 To — (1819)
 To a Cat
 To a Friend Who Sent Me Some Roses (1816)
 To a Lady seen for a few Moments at Vauxhall (1818)
 To A Young Lady Who Sent Me A Laurel Crown (1816 or 1817)
 To Ailsa Rock
 To Autumn (1819) text
 To Lord Byron (1814) text
 To Charles Cowden Clarke (1816)
 To Fanny (1819)
 To G.A.W. (Georgiana Augusta Wylie) (1816)
 To George Felton Mathew (1815)
 To Georgiana Augusta Wylie
 To Haydon
 To Haydon with a Sonnet Written on Seeing the Elgin Marbles (1817)
 To Homer
 To Hope (1815)
 To John Hamilton Reynolds (1818)
 To Kosciusko (1816)
 To Leigh Hunt, Esq. (1817)
 To My Brother George (epistle) (1816)
 To My Brother George (sonnet) (1816)
 To My Brothers (1816)
 To one who has been long in city pent (1816)
 To Sleep
 To Solitude
 To Some Ladies (1815)
 To the Ladies Who Saw Me Crown'd (1816 or 1817)
 To the Nile
 Unfelt, unheard, unseen (1817)
 Welcome Joy... (1818)
 When I have fears that I may cease to be (1818) text
 Where Be Ye Going, You Devon Maid?
 Where's the Poet? (1818)
 Why did I laugh tonight? (1818)
 Woman! when I behold thee flippant, vain (1815 or 1816)
 Written in Disgust of Vulgar Superstition (1816)
 Written in the Cottage Where Burns Was Born (1818)
 Written on a Blank Space
 Written on a Summer Evening
 Written on the Day that Mr Leigh Hunt Left Prison (1815)
 Written Upon the Top of Ben Nevis (also known as "Read Me a Lesson, Muse")
 You say you love; but with a voice (1817 or 1818)

External links
 

Bibliographies by writer
 
Bibliographies of British writers
Poetry bibliographies